"I'm a Better Man" was written by Burt Bacharach and Hal David. It was a hit for Engelbert Humperdinck in 1969. It was a follow up to the previous release, "The Way It Used To Be".

Background
The record was released in the United States on Parrot 40040.

In the 1980s, the song ended up on an Engelbert compilation Release Me which included other songs such as "Release Me", "There Goes My Everything" and "The Last Waltz".

Chart performance
On August 9, 1969, the record reached No. 15 on the UK Singles Chart.

On September 27, 1969, the record peaked at No. 38 on the Billboard Hot 100, and it spent a total of seven weeks on the chart. It also peaked at No. 6 on Billboards Easy Listening chart.

References

1969 songs
1969 singles
Decca Records singles
Engelbert Humperdinck songs
Songs with music by Burt Bacharach
Songs with lyrics by Hal David
Song recordings produced by Peter Sullivan (record producer)